Doors and Windows is the fourth album by Bearfoot, released in 2009.

Development 
In a departure from their previous albums, the band has leaned more on a lead singer, Odessa Jorgensen, who joined the band in September 2008.  However, the band still shares vocals amongst all the other players, with a specialty of sister harmonies backed by twin fiddles.  The recording also is the first time the band has involved guest musicians.  The music performed by Bearfoot has strayed from traditional bluegrass, encompassing multiple other styles under the umbrella of americana.  Although straying further from traditional bluegrass, this is their first album to include the bluegrass staple - the banjo, played by guest performer Alison Brown.  The album debuted at the top of Billboard Magazine's Bluegrass chart.  The band created most of the recording in Netherland, Colorado, and later recorded their latest album in 10 days in a studio at their new home of Nashville, Tennessee.

Track listing

Personnel 
Bearfoot
Odessa Jorgensen – Lead Vocals, Fiddle, Guitar (4, 8)
Angela Oudean – Vocals, Fiddle
Kate Hamre – Lead Vocals (2), Vocals, Bass
Mike Mickelson – Vocals, Guitar, Tenor Guitar
Jason Norris – Vocals, Mandolin

Guest musicians
Larry Atamanuik – Drums and Percussion (2, 3, 4, 5, 6, 8, 10, 11)
Alison Brown – Banjo (5)
Andy Hall – Resophonic Guitar (1, 3)
Todd Phillips – Bass (11)
Andrea Zonn – Strings (4)

References

External links 

2009 albums
Bearfoot (American band) albums